Playero (Spanish for "of the beach") may refer to:

 Playeros (Equatorial Guinea), a group of ethnicities of Equatorial Guinea
 Playeros (Panama), an ethnic group of Panama
 Playeros (Colombia and Venezuela), an indigenous people of Colombia and Venezuela
 Playero language, a language of Colombia and Venezuela
 Playeros, inhabitants of Playa, Ponce, Puerto Rico
 DJ Playero, Puerto Rican musician
 Playeros, nickname for CDCS Costa Del Sol Nairi's, a Belizean football team
 the common Spanish name for several birds of the Calidris genus